Finniss (formerly Queen's Own Town) is a settlement in South Australia. It is on the Victor Harbor railway line just the Adelaide side of where it crosses the Finniss River.

The town was originally surveyed with the name Queen's Own Town (after the Queens Own Regiment of Foot) in 1867 as the railway line was being extended from Goolwa to Strathalbyn. The name of the town was not changed to Finniss until 1940, although the adjacent railway station had already been named Finniss in honour of an early surveyor and the first Premier of South Australia, Colonel Boyle Travers Finniss.

The 2016 Australian census which was conducted in August 2016 reports that Finniss had a population of 293 people.

References

Towns in South Australia